Advocacy of suicide, also known as pro-suicide, has occurred in many cultures and subcultures. Confucianism holds that one should give up one's life, if necessary, either passively or actively, for the sake of upholding the cardinal moral values of ren (altruism) and yi (righteousness). The Japanese military during World War II encouraged and glorified kamikaze attacks, and Japanese society as a whole has been described as "suicide-tolerant" (see Suicide in Japan).

Internet
Advocacy of suicide has also taken place over the Internet. A study by the British Medical Journal found that Web searches for information on suicide are likely to return sites that encourage, and even facilitate, suicide attempts. While pro-suicide resources were less frequent than neutral or anti-suicide sites, they were nonetheless easily accessible. There is some concern that such sites may push the suicidal person over the edge. Some people form suicide pacts with people they meet online. Becker writes, "Suicidal adolescent visitors risk losing their doubts and fears about committing suicide. Risk factors include peer pressure to commit suicide and appointments for joint suicides. Furthermore, some chat rooms celebrate chatters who committed suicide."

William Francis Melchert-Dinkel, 47 years old in May 2010, from Faribault, Minnesota,  a licensed nurse from 1991 until February 2009, stands accused of encouraging people to commit suicide while he watched voyeuristically on a webcam.  He allegedly told these contemplating suicide what methods worked best, that it was okay to commit suicide, that they would be better in heaven, and/or entered into suicide pacts with them. Dinkel was charged with two counts of assisting suicide, for allegedly encouraging the suicides of a person in Britain in 2005 and another person in Canada in 2008.

Suzy's Law would, in the US, ban sites that provide information on suicide methods or otherwise assist suicide. There have been some legal bans on pro-suicide web sites, most notably in Australia, but arguably such bans merely increase awareness of such sites and encourage site owners to move their sites to different jurisdictions.

See also
alt.suicide.holiday
Sanctioned Suicide
Altruistic suicide — a suicide that is done for the benefit of others
Church of Euthanasia
Human extinction
Philosophy of suicide
Pro-ana and Pro-mia — advocacy of eating disorders
Right to die
Suicide prevention
Suicide is Painless

References

Suicide